Frederick Erskine Olmsted, also known as Fritz Olmsted, (November 8, 1872 – February 19, 1925) was an American forester and one of "the founders of American forestry". He is credited with helping to establish the National Forest system in the United States and developed the system of forest management that was applied nationally. He also was a consulting forester and taught at Harvard University. With Olmsted, "Forestry was not merely a career or a business profession; it filled his whole soul and he knew how to love forestry, fight for forestry, and suffer for forestry."

Early life and education 
Olmsted was born in Hartford, Connecticut. He was the son of Lucy Sawyer Hollister and Albert Harry Olmsted, a banker. His father was a half-brother of acclaimed landscape designer Frederick Law Olmsted.

Olmsted went to Hartford Public High School, graduating in 1891. He then attended Yale University where he studied civil engineering, graduating from the Sheffield Scientific School with a Ph.B. in 1894. While there, he was a member of the Fraternity of Delta Psi (St. Anthony Hall) and a member of the Class Cup Committee. He was also the coxswain of the Yale Bulldogs' varsity crew team for three years.

After college, Olmsted worked at his father's bank in Hartford for a year. In 1896, he joined the topographic division of the United States Geological Survey (USGS) at the suggestion of his first-cousin, Frederick Law Olmsted, Jr. He spent eighteen months near Asheville, North Carolina, surveying and building trails and roads, as well as re-surveying the Pisgah Quadrangle. While there, he met Dr. Carl A. Schenck, forester of the Biltmore Estate, and learned about career opportunities of the new field of forestry. He left the USGS and worked for Schenck for a few months. He also attended the earliest incarnation of the Biltmore Forest School which was founded by Schenck; at this time, the school was "on a voluntary basis and highly informal."

Olmsted returned to college, attending graduate school at Harvard University in 1897 and 1898. In the fall of 1897, he took courses at the University of Cambridge and Arnold Arboretum. In the spring of 1898, he spent a year working and studying with foresters in the Black Forest in Baden, Germany. In 1899, he studied forestry under Deitrich Brandis at the University of Munich, receiving a diploma in 1899. In November 1899 at the suggestion of Brandis, he studied practical forestry in the foothills of the Himalayas in India where most of the forests were under state control. He returned to the United States in 1900.

Career 
On July 1, 1900, Olmsted was hired as an assistant forester by Gifford Pichot who was head of the newly established Division of Forestry of the United States Department of Agriculture, now the United States Forest Service. Pichot was also a Yale University graduate and had previously worked with the forests at Biltmore Estate. Olmsted became on the "boundary boys," locating the boundaries of the forest reserves. He typically spent the winters in Washington, D.C., working in the field during the season.

Pichot said he placed Olmsted in charge of the Subdivision of Forest Products in 1902, "because he was one of the most capable, experienced and mature men of the office." From 1902 to 1905, Olmsted was charged with locating any remaining public timber lands so they could be placed in a reservation for management. This process laid the foundation for the modern National Forest system.

Pichot also asked Olmsted to rewrite the unpopular Forest Reserve Manual, prepared by the Forest Service's predecessor institution, the General Land Office Division of Forestry. Olmsted was tasked with explaining "what the forest reserves meant, what they were there for and how to use them—in effect a policy blueprint to clarify forest officer duties concerning general public claims, rights–of–way, charges, duration of permits and other issues likely to arise." In July 1905, the new Use of National Forest, commonly known as the Use Book, was issued by the Forest Service. The was not only an instruction book with goals and regulations for Forest Service employees, it was also one of the first administrative manuals for the United States government. Olmsted changed the tone of the book, characterizing the Forest Service positively as an agency "willing to consider use under certain conditions".

Olmsted had a passion for his work and a gift for supervising his team, which included Coert DuBois (Olmsted's brother-in-law), R. L. Frome, John H. Hatton, William G. Hodge, G. M. Homans, E. A. Lane, George B. Lull, George W. Peavey, and C. S. Smith. From 1905 to 1908, Olmsted was the California Inspector. Beginning in 1908, he was the Chief Inspector of District 5 or a District Forester, working out of an office in the Merchants Exchange Building in San Francisco. As forester for District 5, he was in charge of the national forests in California and western Nevada. In this era, "the district forester was likened to being an 'autonomous king' and overlord of a domain—controlled only by laws broadly interpreted and by general policy."

Although he had specific assignments such as surveying boundaries, tracking the size of timber sales, and submitting annual grazing statistics, Olmsted had total authority over staff and use of the district's money. In this capacity, he developed a field inspection system that was implemented throughout the Forest Service. His team also sought to save the "West from itself through public forestry and with the West's consent and support, to break the monopoly and favor the little man." They had to settle issues with the Homestead Forest Act which was passed by Congress in June 1906. This Act required the Forest Service to review all lands to determine if they were better suited for agriculture than forestry, opening those that were for homesteading. As a result, there was a land rush and the District 5 offices received some 12,000 applications for 1,144 acres of homesteading land—processing the applications and overseeing the program took a significant amount of time away from their main focus of forestry. In addition to legal residents of the forest, Olmsted and his team also had to deal with illegal squatters within the national forests. However, the main job of District 5 was timber management.

In 1907, Olmsted presided over a meeting of forest supervisors in Yreka, Siskiyou County, California. That same year, businessman and congressman William Kent wrote a letter to Pinchot and Olmsted about his efforts to donate 211 acres known as Muir Woods to the United States. He had been told there was not a way for the government to accept this gift. Olmsted visited the site and wrote a letter to the United States Secretary of the Interior requesting that Muir Woods become a national monument under the Antiquities Act. President Theodore Roosevelt declared it Muir Woods National Monument on January 9, 1908. Olmsted is credited as being vital to its establishment because of his creativity in interpreting United States laws and regulations. Other sites receiving National Forest status under Olmsted's oversight include Angeles National Forest, Calaveras Big Tree National Forest, Cleveland National Forest, Eldorado National Forest, Inyo National Forest, Kern National Forest, Klamath National Forest, Lassen National Forest, Modoc National Forest, Mono National Forest, Monterey National Forest, Plumas National Forest, Santa Barbara National Forest, Sequoia National Forest, Shasta National Forest, Sierra National Forest, Stanislaus National Forest, Tahoe National Forest, and Trinity National Forest. Thus, California gained a system of  publicly-owned national forests through Olmsted's administration.

In 1909, Olmsted served on a three-person committee to develop a plan for California's highway trees. However, in January 1910, President William Howard Taft fired and replaced Pinchot as head of the Forest Service. That year was also the worst fire season in the United States since the creation of the Forest Service. Olmsted noted, "If one-hundredth of the damage from fire this past summer had occurred in any German state, the whole forest force would have been promptly dismissed." In December 1910, Olmsted convened a five–day meeting of District 5's supervisors. Although he never mentioned Pinchot by name, Olmsted began the meeting with a review of Pinchot's philosophy regarding the timber lands of the West. Olmsted's meeting covered all of District 5's programs, including fire protection, grazing, reforestation, timber sales, wildlife, and working plans. Because of this meeting, all forest supervisors were required to submit a forest protection plan and there were increases in the number of California's forest guards.

In June 1911, Olmsted resigned from his job with the Forest Service. He said wanted to return to the forest and leave the administrative offices behind. He became a consulting forester with the firm Fisher & Bryant, along with Professor Richard T. Fisher and Edward S. Bryant who were both graduates of Harvard University, Renamed Fisher, Bryant and Olmsted, their offices were at 141 Milk Street in Boston, Massachusetts. However, Olmsted left the firm after 1912.

In the spring semester of 1913, Olmsted taught forestry at Harvard University. That same year, Harvard and Yale University had both lost most of their historic elms to damage caused by the gypsy moth, the leopard moth, and the brown-tail moth. It was estimated that it would take fifty to 100 years before the campus trees were restored. Olmsted noted that the universities neglected their historic trees because there was "a feeling was evident that the elms had always had been there and always would be in spite of various setbacks."

As a consulting forester, Olmsted created regulations to prevent fires on the Canadian railways. In the fall of 1913, he moved back to California, working out of San Francisco from 1913 to 1914, and Sausalito from 1914 to 1915. In 1913, he developed a plan to protect Mount Tamalpais and the surrounding area of Marin County from fires and organized the Tamalpais Fire Protection Association. In November 1915, he was elected secretary of the Tamalpais Fire Association. He also supervised the association's rangers for three years as its head patrolman, before stepping down in March 1917.

During World War I, Olmsted again worked for the Forest Service. He spent six months determining which lumber production was essential and nonessential. In 1917, he moved his consulting forester office to Palo Alto, California where he specialized "in inspection of logging operations with a view to efficient utilization of material and future productiveness of cut-over lands; systematic protection against fire; timber estimates and appraisals; topographic mapping; and logging plans."

Olmsted was a founder of the Society of American Foresters (SAF). He served as SAF president in 1919 and supported federal oversight of private cutting. The Diamond Match Company hired Olmsted "to introduce and supervise conservative cutting on its California holdings". He worked for them until he retired in 1923.

Personal life 
He married Florence Starbuck DuBois on September 13, 1909. She was the daughter of Evelina Patterson Kimball and Dr. John C. DuBois, a graduate of Yale University. They had two sons, Frederick Erskine Olmsted Jr. and Julian Olmsted. Another child, DuBois Olmsted, died in infancy.

Olmsted was a member of Century Club in Washington, D.C., serving on its board of governors and as chairman of the committee of literature and art. He was also a non-resident member of the Cosmos Club. In addition, he was a member of Park Congregational Church in Hartford, Connecticut.

In 1911, the family moved to Boston, Massachusetts, and lived at 21 Lime Street. They moved back to California in 1913. In 1917, Olmsted hired architect Henry Higby Gutterson to design a shingle style house for his family at 773 Dolores Street on the campus Stanford University. The family moved there in 1918. The relationship between Olmsted and Stanford University is unknown, although he did correspond with the university's president David Star Jordan from 1912 to 1919. It is possible that Olmsted helped plan and plant Stanford University Arboretum as a consulting forester. His uncle, Frederick Law Olmsted had created the master plan for the campus in 1888, but work had ended on the arboretum in 1891 and was still needed in 1906.

In 1925, Olmsted died at his Dolores Street home in Palo Alto, California from cancer of the liver. He was cremated at Cypress Hill Crematorium in San Francisco and buried in Cedar Hill Cemetery in Hartford, Connecticut.

Publications 

 "A Working Plan for Forest Lands near Pine Bluff, Arkansas." U.S. Department of Agriculture, Bureau of Forestry Bulletin No. 32, 1902.
 "Tests on the Physical Properties of Timber." Yearbook of the United States Department of Agriculture, 1902.
 Report on a Preliminary Examination of the Forest of the U.S. Military Academy, West Point, NY., 1903.
 Use of the National Forest Reservices. Washington, D.C.: Forest Service, U.S. Department of Agriculture, 1905.
 The Use of National Forests. Washington, D.C.: Forest Service, U.S. States Department of Agriculture, 1907.
 Muir National Monument, Redwood Canyon, Marin County, California. NAMW. December 26, 1907.
 "Forest Conditions of California and Suggestions for their Improvement." Transactions of the Commonwealth Club of California, vol. 4, 1909, p. 78-82.
 "Fire and the Forest--The Theory of "Light Burning." Sierra Club Bulletin, January 1911, pp. 42-47.:
 How Forestry Uses Fire: Practical Work on the California National Forests." 1911.
 Light Burning in California Forests. Washington, D.C.: U.S. Printing Office, 1911.
 Mt. Tamalpais and Vicinity. California: Mountain Tamalpais Fire Association, 1915.
 "The Lumberman's Duty Toward Forestry.'" Proceedings of the Society of American Foresters. vol. 1, no. 1, January 1916. p. 79-83.
 "Activities of the Society of American Foresters." Journal of Forestry, vol. 17, 1917. p. 663-665.
 Sketches of the Redwood Coast Map of Proposed Humboldt Redwoods State Park''. California, 1929.

References 

1957 deaths
1925 deaths
People from Hartford, Connecticut
Yale University alumni
St. Anthony Hall
Yale Bulldogs rowers
United States Geological Survey personnel
Biltmore Forest School
Harvard University alumni
Ludwig Maximilian University of Munich alumni
United States Forest Service officials
Harvard University faculty
Deaths from liver cancer
People from California
Deaths from cancer in California
American foresters